North West Division may refer to:

 The North-West Land Division, a cadastral division of Western Australia
 The North West Division of the High Court of South Africa, a superior court of law in Mahikeng, South Africa